Ghampani is a 2017 Nepali language drama film written and directed by film critic Dipendra Lama. It stars Dayahang Rai and Keki Adhikari in leading roles. The film has two songs composed by Kali Prasad Baskota and Chandra Kumar Dong. Ghampani recorded as a hit at the box office, collecting 12 million rupees in the first three days after its release.

Plot 
Two childhood friends Furba Tamang (Dayahang) and Tara Sharma (Keki) have affection for each other. Furba stays in village as a teacher, while Tara goes to Kathmandu to get higher education. During Tara's annual vacation to village, they flourish their intimate relationship further more. Tara's father Pitambar and Furba's father Maila are very good friends and neighbors. Pitambar, former president of the village development committee gradually discovers his daughter's affair with Furba. Then he decides to tie his daughter's knot with Kamal Adhikari, a police assistant sub-inspector. In return, Tara and Furba choose a path of revolt. They draw a plan to make their love a success and to treat Kamal with a sweet revenge.

Cast

 Dayahang Rai as Furba Tamang
 Keki Adhikari as Tara Sharma
 Ankeet Khadka
 Silsa Jirel
 Prakash Ghimire as Tara's Father
 Pushkar Gurung
 Buddhi Tamang
 Kabita Ale
 Aruna Karki
 Amogh Pokharel
 Keshav Rai
 Saroj Aryal
 Prem Barsha Khadka
 Ganesh Munal
 Laxmi Bardewa
 Mani Ram Pokharel
 Ujjawal Sharma Bhandari
 Samrant Thapa

Soundtrack 

 'Panchhi' is a modern song composed by popular musician Kali Prasad Baskota, describes about the freedom of two lovers.
 'Apa lai Mero' is a Tamang Traditional Song sung by Sanjeev Waiba, Phul Kumar Bamjan and Jitu Lopchan. It explains the value of cultural harmony.

Awards 
Ghampani was nominated for the Best debut director (Dipendra Lama), Best script (Dipendra Lama) and Best supporting actor (Ankeet Khadka) in the 5th INAS (International Nepalese Artist Society) film award held in Kathmandu on 13 October 2017. It won Best script award and Best film jury award.

References

External links
 

2017 drama films
2017 films
Nepalese drama films
2010s Nepali-language films